Guam National Shooting Sports Federation is the Guamanian association for olympic shooting under the International Shooting Sport Federation.

See also 
 Guam Shooting Sports Federation

References

External links 
 Official homepage of Guam National Shooting Sports Federation

Shooting sports organizations
Shooting